Aerodactyl may refer to:

 Aerodactylus, an extinct species of pterosaur
 Aerodactyl (Pokémon), a Pokémon species